Events in the year 2006 in Namibia.

Incumbents 

 President: Hifikepunye Pohamba
 Prime Minister: Nahas Angula
 Chief Justice of Namibia: Peter Shivute

Events 

 The Namibian Music Awards (NMA) begins.
 Tura Magic F.C. is founded.

Deaths

References 

 
2000s in Namibia
Years of the 21st century in Namibia
Namibia
Namibia